The Royal Spanish Swimming Federation founded in 1920, is the aquatics national federation for Spain. It oversees competition in the 5 aquatics disciplines (swimming, diving, open water swimming, synchronized swimming and water polo) and Masters competition in these. As of 2020, the federation has 862 registered clubs and 67,483 federated swimmers.

It is affiliated to:

FINA, which oversees international swimming;
LEN, which oversees swimming in Europe;
COE, the Spanish Olympic Committee

See also
Spain men's national water polo team
Spain women's national water polo team

References

External links
Official website

Spain
Swimming in Spain
Aquatics
Spain
Spain
Organisations based in Spain with royal patronage